Eastridge High School is an American public high school located in Irondequoit, New York. The School is an IB (International Baccalaureate) world school. It also offers Honors and AP classes. Its current principal is Timothy Heaphy. This is the main high school in the East Irondequoit Central School District. The school also features a marching band, indoor percussion ensemble and drama club for yearly shows. On May 7, 2015, Eastridge High School was named one of ten schools chosen as a School of Opportunity by the National Education Policy Center (NEPC). More than 80 schools applied and four were awarded “Gold Recognition” and six earned “Silver Recognition”.  Eastridge is one of the schools awarded Silver Recognition.

Band and indoor percussion 
The East Irondequoit Lancer Marching Band has won six state championships over 35 years in the New York State Field Band Conference, in 1985, 1992, 1993, 1994, 1998 and 1999.

Notable alumni

Steve Gadd, jazz drummer
Al Masino, former NBA player
Joseph Morelle, politician
Laureen Oliver, co-founder of the Independence Party of New York

References

External links 

Public high schools in New York (state)
International Baccalaureate schools in New York (state)
High schools in Monroe County, New York